The men's featherweight event was part of the boxing programme at the 1972 Summer Olympics. The weight class allowed boxers of up to 57 kilograms to compete. The competition was held from 27 August to 10 September 1972. 45 boxers from 45 nations competed.

Medalists

Results
The following boxers took part in the event:

First round
 Pasqualino Morbidelli (ITA) def. Morgan Mwenya (ZAM), 5:0
 Angelos Theotokatos (GRE) def. Lema Yemane (ETH), 5:0
 Louis Self (USA) def. Maurice Apeang (FRA), 5:0
 Michael Andrews (NGR) def. Abdou Faye (SEN), 5:0
 András Botos (HUN) def. Nopparat Preecha (THA), 5:0
 José Baptista (VEN) def. Emmanuel Eloundou (CMR), 5:0
 Boris Kuznetsov (URS) def. Harouna Lago (NIG), KO-1
 Rudolf Vogel (SUI) def. Joseph Mbourokounda (GAB), 3:2
 Ryszard Tomczyk (POL) def. Juan Francisco García (MEX), 4:1
 Jochen Bachfeld (GDR) def. Peter Prause (FRG), 5:0
 William Taylor (GBR) def. Lahcen Maghfour (MAR), 5:0
 Gabriel Pometcu (ROU) def. Nils Dag Stromme (NOR), KO-1
 Orlando Palacios (CUB) def. Joe Cofie (GHA), 4:1

Second round
 Salah Mohamed Amin (EGY) def. Guy Segbaya (TOG), 5:0
 Philip Waruinge (KEN) def. Jabbar Feli (IRI), 4:1
 Jouko Lindberg (FIN) def. Deogratias Musoke (UGA), 5:0
 Alberto Mario Ortíz (ARG) def. José Luis Vellón (PUR), 4:1
 Kuncho Kunchev (BUL) def. Palamdorj Baatar (MGL), 3:2
 Clemente Rojas (COL) def. Dale Anderson (CAN), 3:2
 Antonio Rubio (ESP) def. Jungle Thangata (MLW), TKO-3
 Habibu Kinyogoli (TNZ) def. Sun Soth (CMB), 5:0
 Royal Kobayashi (JPN) def. Pat Ryan (NZL), 4:1
 Pasqualino Morbidelli (ITA) def. Seyfi Tatar (TUR), 5:0
 Louis Self (USA) def. Angelos Theotokatos (GRE), 5:0
 András Botos (HUN) def. Michael Andrews (NGR), 5:0
 Boris Kuznetsov (URS) def. José Baptista (VEN), 3:2
 Ryszard Tomczyk (POL) def. Rudolf Vogel (SUI), KO-2
 Jochen Bachfeld (GDR) def. William Taylor (GBR), 5:0
 Gabriel Pometcu (ROU) def. Orlando Palacios (CUB), 4:1

Third round
 Philip Waruinge (KEN) def. Salah Mohamed Amin (EGY), 5:0
 Jouko Lindberg (FIN) def. Alberto Mario Ortíz (ARG), 4:1
 Clemente Rojas (COL) def. Kuncho Kunchev (BUL), walk-over
 Antonio Rubio (ESP) def. Habibu Kinyogoli (TNZ), 5:0
 Royal Kobayashi (JPN) def. Pasqualino Morbidelli (ITA), KO-1
 András Botos (HUN) def. Louis Self (USA), 3:2
 Boris Kuznetsov (URS) def. Ryszard Tomczyk (POL), 5:0
 Gabriel Pometcu (ROU) def. Jochen Bachfeld (GDR), 5:0

Quarterfinals
 Philip Waruinge (KEN) def. Jouko Lindberg (FIN), 4:1
 Clemente Rojas (COL) def. Antonio Rubio (ESP), DSQ-2
 András Botos (HUN) def. Royal Kobayashi (JPN), 4:1
 Boris Kuznetsov (URS) def. Gabriel Pometcu (ROU), 4:1

Semifinals
 Philip Waruinge (KEN) def. Clemente Rojas (COL), 3:2
 Boris Kuznetsov (URS) def. András Botos (HUN), 5:0

Final
 Boris Kuznetsov (URS) def. Philip Waruinge (KEN), 3:2

References

Featherweight